Chen Xujing (1 September 1903 – 16 February 1967) was a leading Chinese sociologist.

Biography
Chen Xujing was born in Hainan. He was schooled in Singapore and at Lingnan Middle School, at which he enrolled in 1920. He graduated from Fudan University in 1925. After receiving a PhD in Political Science from the University of Illinois in 1928, he published his thesis on theories of sovereignty in the following year. While holding a sociology post at Lingnan University, he travelled to study in Germany. He became a professor at Nankai University, heading the Economic Research Institute and School of Politics and Economics, and serving as vice president of the university. After serving as Vice President of Zhongshan University, he became President of Lingnan University in 1948, and subsequently President of Jinan University in Guangzhou.

Works

References

External links

1903 births
1967 deaths
Chinese sociologists
Hwa Chong Institution alumni
People's Republic of China politicians from Hainan
Writers from Hainan
Academic staff of Nankai University
Academic staff of Sun Yat-sen University
Academic staff of Jinan University
Victims of the Cultural Revolution
Fudan University alumni
People from Wenchang
University of Illinois Urbana-Champaign alumni
Academic staff of Lingnan University (Guangzhou)
Chinese political philosophers
Chinese political scientists
Republic of China economists
20th-century Chinese economists
Presidents of Lingnan University (Guangzhou)
University of Kiel alumni
Republic of China writers
People's Republic of China economists
Economists from Hainan
20th-century political scientists